The Crime Writers of Canada Award for Best Novel is an annual literary award, presented as part of the Crime Writers of Canada Awards of Excellence program to honour books judged as the best crime novel published by a Canadian crime writer in the previous year.

1980s

1990s

2000s

2010s

2020s

References

Canadian fiction awards
Mystery and detective fiction awards